The Fighting Cholitas are a group of female wrestlers who perform in El Alto, Bolivia. The Cholitas are part of a group called the Titans of the Ring, which includes both male and female wrestlers. The Titans perform each Sunday for an audience of hundreds at El Alto's Multifunctional Center. Tickets to the exhibitions cost $1.

The idea of including female wrestlers as a maneuver for publicity came from Juan Mamami, a wrestler and president of the Titans. They routinely attract over a thousand spectators to their bouts in El Alto and several hundred spectators when they travel with the Titans to smaller towns.

Like the general population of El Alto, which consists almost entirely of Aymara and Quechua residents, the Cholitas are indigenous. They wear braided hair, bowler hats and multilayered skirts in the ring.

According to a 2005 New York Times article, the Titans earn about $13 for each bout. Most of the wrestlers have other jobs besides their wrestling careers.

Media
The Cholitas were the subject of an award-winning 2006 short-subject documentary, The Fighting Cholitas. The twenty-minute documentary was directed by Mariam Jobrani and produced by Jobrani, Teresa Deskins and Kenny Krauss. The film received an honorable mention in Short Filmmaking at the 2007 Sundance Film Festival.

In October 2008, the Fighting Cholitas were featured in the third episode of thirteenth season of the American reality series The Amazing Race, in which a contestant from each team was tasked with learning and performing a six-step wrestling routine with a Cholita.

References

External links
 

Bolivian documentary films
2006 short documentary films
Lucha libre films
Documentary films about women's sports
Sport in Bolivia
Women's professional wrestling films
Professional wrestling documentary films
Professional wrestling-related mass media
Professional wrestling in Bolivia
Women in Bolivia